The 1939 Western State Teachers Broncos football team represented Western State Teachers College (later renamed Western Michigan University) as an independent during the 1939 college football season.  In their 11th season under head coach Mike Gary, the Broncos compiled a 2–6–1 record and were outscored by their opponents, 85 to 51.  The team played its home games at Waldo Stadium in Kalamazoo, Michigan. The stadium, built at a cost of $270,000, was dedicated on November 4, 1939, prior to the game against Western Kentucky.

Center Art Guse was the team captain. Halfback Dave Kribs received the team's most outstanding player award.

Schedule

References

Western State Teachers
Western Michigan Broncos football seasons
Western State Teachers Broncos football